Little Tony may refer to:

 Little Tony (film), Dutch comedy film
 Little Tony (singer) (1941–2013), Italian-born pop singer and actor
 Tony Leung Chiu-wai (AKA Little Tony, born 1962), Hong Kong film and TV actor